Edward Charlton (24 July 1814 – 14 May 1874) was an English physician, writer and historian.

Born in Bellingham, Northumberland, he contributed to journals of the Society of Antiquaries of Newcastle upon Tyne.

In 1872 he succeeded Dr. Dennis Embleton as Professor of Medicine at University of Durham College of Medicine.

Works
In 1870 his book Memorials of North Tynedale and its four surnames was published. It discussed the "chief" four clans in the area (the Charltons, Robsons, Dodds and Mylborne), and is an introduction to the subject of the Border Reivers. It raised the subject that for every family "there be certeyne hedesman that leadeth and answereth all for the rest".

Contributions to the Society of Antiquaries of Newcastle upon Tyne

To "Archaeologia aeliana, or, Miscellaneous tracts relating to antiquity" – Published by the Society of Antiquaries of Newcastle upon Tyne - 1861. New series, Volume V, Printed by William Dodd, Number 6 Bigg Market, Newcastle upon Tyne: Sold by J Q Forster, Clayton Street, 1861
This included articles entitled :-
  Early German versions of the Bible on page 91
  Drinking Tripods  - (jointly written by Mr Way) - on page 11
  North Tynedale in the sixteenth century – on page 118
  Ancient vases from Malta – on page 131
  Roman bridge at Cilurnum – on page 142, 148
  Inlaid Spearhead – on page 143
  Instruments of the Saxon Period found near Lanchester – on page 159
  Dagger from Muggleswick – on page 170
  Chalice from Hexham – on page 170

Contributions to "Archaeologia aeliana"
This book, alternatively titled "or Miscellaneous tracts relating to antiquity" – Published by the Society of Antiquaries of Newcastle upon Tyne - 1865. New series, Volume VI, Printed by William Dodd, Number 6 Bigg Market, Newcastle upon Tyne: Sold by J Q Forster, Clayton Street, 1865
This included articles entitled :-
  Ms. Of Gower’s "Cconfession Amantis" – on page 12
  Old Recipes – on page 17
  Jacobite relics of 1715 and 1745 – on page 29
  Ecclesiastical vestments – on page 34
  Gold ornament found in North Tynedale – on page 48
  The Roman bridge of Cilurnum(with plan and view.) – on page 80
  Reverse of the seal of Dunfermlin Abbey – on page 106
  The Orkney Rvnes (with illustrations.) - on page127, 184
  Ancient Breviary – on page 149
  Roman caricature of Christianity (with facsimile.) – on page 198
  Abstract of Will of Christopher Milbourne – on page 232

All are described in the index as being written by Dr. Charlton and above each paper by Edward Charlton M.D.

See also
 Geordie dialect words

References

19th-century English medical doctors
1814 births
1874 deaths
People from Bellingham, Northumberland
19th-century British historians
English male non-fiction writers
19th-century male writers